Curling clubs in the Canadian province of Newfoundland and Labrador are organized into the Newfoundland and Labrador Curling Association. The NLCA divides the province into four zones.

North
Carol Curling Club - Labrador City
Churchill Falls Curling Club - Churchill Falls
Goose Bay Curling Club - Goose Bay

Central
Exploits Regional Curling Club - Grand Falls
Gander Curling Club - Gander
Glovertown - Glovertown
Lewisporte Curling Association - Lewisporte
Llew Budden Memorial Curling Club - Buchans

West
Caribou Curling Club - Stephenville
Corner Brook Curling Association - Corner Brook
Gateway Junior Curling Club - Port aux Basques
Rattling Brook Curling Association - Baie Verte

East
Bally Haly Golf & Curling Club - St. John's
St. John's Curling Club - St. John's

 Newfoundland
Curling clubs
Sports venues in Newfoundland and Labrador
 
Curling in Newfoundland and Labrador
Newfoundland and Labrador